The 2014 Brisbane Lions season is the club's 18th season in the Australian Football League (AFL). The club also fielded its reserves team in the NEAFL.

Squad

 Players are listed by jersey number, and 2014 statistics are for AFL regular season and finals series matches during the 2013 AFL season only. Career statistics include a player's complete AFL career, which, as a result, means that a player's debut and part or whole of their career statistics may be for another club. Statistics are correct of Round 19 of the 2014 season (3 August 2014) and are taken from AFL Tables

Season summary

Pre-season matches

Home and Away Season

Ladder

References

External links

Brisbane Lions seasons